Leucostigma is a genus of air-breathing land snails, terrestrial pulmonate gastropod mollusks in the family Clausiliidae, the door snails. 

This taxon occurs off Nîmes, France.

Species
 Leucostigma candidescens (Rossmässler, 1835)
Subspecies
 Leucostigma candidescens candidescens (Rossmässler, 1835)
 Leucostigma candidescens convertitum (Flach, 1907)
 Leucostigma candidescens dextromira H. Nordsieck, 2011
 Leucostigma candidescens leucostigma (Rossmässler, 1836)
 Leucostigma candidescens megachilus (Paulucci, 1881)
 Leucostigma candidescens monticola H. Nordsieck, 2011
 Leucostigma candidescens opalinum (Rossmässler, 1836)
 Leucostigma candidescens paraconvertitum H. Nordsieck, 2011
 Leucostigma candidescens samniticum (Rossmässler, 1842)
Species brought into synonymy
 Leucostigma leucostigma (Rossmässler, 1836): synonym of Leucostigma candidescens leucostigma  (Rossmässler, 1836) (superseded combination)

References

Sources
 Rossmässler, E. A. (1835-1837). Iconographie der Land- & Süßwasser- Mollusken, mit vorzüglicher Berücksichtigung der europäischen noch nicht abgebildeten Arten.
 Bank, R. A. (2017). Classification of the Recent terrestrial Gastropoda of the World. Last update: July 16th, 2017
 Bank, R. A.; Neubert, E. (2017). Checklist of the land and freshwater Gastropoda of Europe. Last update: July 16th, 2017

External links
 

 Clausiliidae